Fort Western is a former British colonial outpost at the head of navigation on the Kennebec River at modern Augusta, Maine, United States. It was built in 1754 during the French and Indian War, and is now a National Historic Landmark and local historic site owned by the city.  Its main building, the only original element of the fort to survive, was restored in 1920 and now depicts its original use as a trading post.

French and Indian War 

Fort Western was built by a Boston land company (the Kennebec Proprietors) in 1754 as a fortified trading post, and to promote settlement in the area. The fort was a log palisade with blockhouses which protected a store and warehouse. It was never directly attacked.  From a high elevation a large rectangular enclosure commanded the river for more than a mile.  Blockhouses 24 feet square and watch-boxes 12 feet square guarded opposite corners, and within stood a two-story main house .  After the war ended, James Howard, its last commander, purchased the fort and operated the trading post.

American Revolution

After 1769, Fort Western fell into decay. In 1775, Benedict Arnold's expedition to Quebec stopped at Fort Western long enough to repair bateaux.  Arnold, Daniel Morgan, Roger Enos, and Aaron Burr stayed as guests in the garrison while their force camped outside. Fort Western was the starting point for the march through the wilderness to Quebec.

Old Fort Western

The main building of the fort eventually passed out of the Howard family, and was converted into a tenement house.  It was repurchased in Howard family descendants in 1919, and restored the following year, which included the construction of two new blockhouses and a stockade.  The stockade was again rebuilt in 1960.  Today its main building is a little-altered example of an 18th-century trading post. The fort and store are maintained as a museum and are open to the public during the summer months.

The fort was listed on the National Register of Historic Places in 1969, and was declared a National Historic Landmark in 1973.

See also
Cushnoc Archeological Site, adjacent to the fort
List of National Historic Landmarks in Maine
National Register of Historic Places listings in Kennebec County, Maine

References

External links
The Old Fort Western web site

Buildings and structures in Augusta, Maine
Western
National Historic Landmarks in Maine
Infrastructure completed in 1754
Western
Museums in Kennebec County, Maine
Military and war museums in Maine
History museums in Maine
Living museums in Maine
Tourist attractions in Augusta, Maine
Western
1754 establishments in Massachusetts
National Register of Historic Places in Augusta, Maine
Log buildings and structures on the National Register of Historic Places in Maine